Raja Ravindra is an Indian actor predominantly appears in Telugu films and TV serials. Apart from Telugu films, he has acted in several Tamil films and a few Kannada and Malayalam movies. He started his career with TV serials and entered into films.

Career
His first film as an actor is Paccha Toranam (1994). After acting in films like Pedarayudu (1995), he ventured into film production and dates management of heroes.

Family
His daughter got married in April 2014.

Filmography

Telugu

Tamil

Malayalam
 One film (name unknown)

TV series
 Vasundhara:Andam (ETV)
 FIR (ETV)
Krishnadasi (Sun TV); 2000-2001
 Janaki Kalaganaledu (Star Maa); 2021

References

Living people
Telugu male actors
Indian male film actors
Male actors in Tamil cinema
Male actors from Andhra Pradesh
People from West Godavari district
Male actors in Telugu cinema
Indian male television actors
Male actors in Telugu television
20th-century Indian male actors
21st-century Indian male actors
1970 births